Tom Paquot (born 22 September 1999) is a Belgian cyclist, who currently rides for UCI WorldTeam .

Major results
2017
 3rd E3 Harelbeke Junioren
2019
 1st Stage 4 Tour de Liège
 2nd 
 4th Grand Prix des Marbriers
2020
 1st Overall 
1st Stage 1
 1st 
2021
 3rd Tour du Doubs
 8th Grote Prijs Jef Scherens
 10th Classic Grand Besançon Doubs

References

External links

1999 births
Living people
Belgian male cyclists
Sportspeople from Liège
Cyclists from Liège Province
21st-century Belgian people